Murtijapur is a Municipal council and one of the taluka of district of Akola of Amravati  division of Vidarbha region of Maharashtra.

Geography
Murtijapur is located at an average elevation of 308 metres (1210 feet).
It is an important railway junction station in Akola district and is under Bhusawal-Badnera Section of Bhusawal Division of Central Railway.

Two out of three narrow gauge branch lines in Bhusawal railway division of central railway viz Murtijapur - Achalpur and Murtijapur - Yavatmal operate here.

Demographics
 India census, Murtijapur had a population of 40,295. Males constitute 51% of the population and females 49%. Murtijapur has an average literacy rate of 76%, higher than the national average of 59.5%: male literacy is 80%, and female literacy is 72%. In Murtijapur , 13% of the population is under 6 years of age.

Transport

Murtajapur railway station is the junction station of the 762mm narrow gauge railway known locally as the Shakuntala Express. This line is composed of two legs intersecting with the Howrah-Nagpur-Mumbai line at Murtajapur — the 76 km northern leg to Achalpur railway station and the 113 km southeastern leg to Yavatmal railway station. As of 2004 this line was still owned by a London-based company which had leased the line to India's Central Railway since 1903.

Post
Murtijapur has a post office with PIN code 444107. The PIN code is shared with other post offices in the tehsil viz Murtijapur City, Ambhora, Bhatori, Ghota, Ghunshi, Hirpur, Kherda Vilegaon, Kinkhed, Kajaleshwar, Kanadi, Kanzara, Lakhpuri, Mangrul Kambe, Nimbha, Sirso, Wai Pargane Mana, Sonori.

School education
Murtijapur has schools from pre-primary to graduation in arts, science, and commerce. Still, there is a scope for colleges to provide education in engineering and medicine.

Healthcare
The town has primary healthcare centres run by the State Government and a few privately run clinics. The town still lacks good healthcare services. There is Govt. Hospital name Smt. Laxmibai Deshmukh Govt Hospital which has many facilities and it is sub district hospital.

Economy
Agriculture is the prime profession. Few small industries like oil mills and cotton pressing factories can be seen in MIDC. Despite having good connectivity to the major cities like Mumbai, Hyderabad and Nagpur, one can see the lack of growth in this old town. Usually, people go to nearby cities like Akola, Paratwada and Amravati for shopping, medical facilities and purchase of automobiles.

Places of interest
 Sri pundlikbaba gorakshan sanstha.
 Muramba - Dr. Vijay Bhatkar's birthplace (India's Supercomputer Scientist and Padma Bhushan).
 Gadge Baba Mahavidyalaya - Famous for coaching The national Game coaching Kho-Kho & Kabaddi. winner team in state every year.
 Gorakshan - Famous for distributing food to beggars and poor in morning and evening 
 Dr. Bhimrao Ambedkar Statue {State founder of Indian Constitution} 
 Lumbini Buddha Vihar Mhaisang road
 Nagsen Buddha Vihar Nagsen Nagar 
 Muslim Residential School Sonari - on National Highway 
 Katepurna- Famous for a temple of Goddess Durga
 Pundalik Nagar - Famous for a temple of Sant Pundalik Maharaj
 Shree Tuljabhavani Mandir Virahit
 Kanzara Famous temple of lord Shiva and punjaji maharaj.
 Lord Shiva marriage event will celebrate the village people every year in Kanzara. 
 Lakhpuri Famous temple of lord shiva
 Shree Akkalkot Swami Samartha Santhan - The oldest math of Swami Samarth build by Shri Naranrao Jamadar by order and blessings of Shri Ballapa Maharaj( S.S 1845 )
 Shree Maruti Devasthan DEVARAN
 Shree Ramkrushna Mandir MANA
 Shree Vitthal Mandir MANA
 Shri Badri Baba Samadhi Mandir
 Shree Kartik Swami Mandir
 Shree Markandeshwar Mandir Murtijapur
 Shree Vittalrao Jamadar Samadhi
 Shri Mahadev mandir Rajnapur Khinkhini
 Shri Jayaji Maharaj Mandir, Hirpur
 Old Ram Mandir In old city
 Queensland Garden and lawn
 pratik nagar hanuman Mandir

See also
T. S. Korde
Vijay Bhatkar

References

Bollywood & Beyond Germany Nominations

Cities and towns in Akola district
Talukas in Maharashtra